The 2019 Liga 1 U-20 was the ninth edition of the Indonesia Junior Level League system since its introduction in 2008 and the first of the Elite Pro Academy since being changed from an under-19 to under-20. The season started on 20 July and finished with a final on 12 October 2019.

Persebaya U20s won the title on 12 October 2019 after defeating Barito Putera U20s 3–0 on penalties after 3–3 draw until extra time in the final.

First round
First round was the group stage and was started on 20 July 2019. Group A and B played home and away round-robin tournament while Group C played home tournament round-robin. The winners and runner-ups from each group along with two best third-placed teams advanced to second round.

Group A

Group B

Group C

Ranking of third-placed teams

Second round
Second round was the group stage and is played from 10 September – 1 October 2019. All groups played home and away round-robin tournament. The winners and runner-ups from each group advance to semi-finals. The draw for the group was held on 3 September 2019.

Group X

Group Y

Knock-out round

Bracket

Semi-finals

Third place

Final

Awards
 Top goalscorers: Kahar Kalu (Barito Putera U20s, 15 goals)
 Best player: Yuswanto Aditya (Barito Putera U20s)
 Fair-play team: PSIS U20s

References

Liga 1 U-20
Liga 1 U-20
Liga 1 U-20